Patrick McGeehan (March 4, 1907 – January 3, 1988) was an American actor.

Early life
Patrick Joseph McGeehan was born in Harrisburg, Pennsylvania on March 4, 1907. He left home at age 14 when he went to sea, later working in vaudeville, and was a tightrope walker's assistant with the Barnum & Bailey Circus.

Career
McGeehan began his career in 1935 on radio.

He played Ben Calvert on the NBC radio soap, Aunt Mary (1942-1951). He was the narrator for Ceiling Unlimited on CBS (1942-1943). He played Detective Bill Lance on The Adventures of Bill Lance on CBS (1945). He was a comic foil for Red Skelton and the announcer for The Red Skelton Show on NBC (1951-1965).

For many years, McGeehan was one of a series of announcers who were the brunt of some of Skelton’s best known-lines. He was also an actor on The Adventures of Maisie (as Eddie Jordan) on the Mutual Radio Network (1949-1952), Stars over Hollywood on CBS (1941-1954), The Jack Benny Program (1932-1955) and Fibber McGee and Molly (1959). At his peak, McGeehan did more than 40 shows a week. He was the voice of The Hour of St. Francis, a Catholic radio show, where he gained worldwide recognition for his recitation of the peace prayer of St. Francis.

Throughout the 1940s and early 1950s, he had roles in many cartoons at the Metro-Goldwyn-Mayer cartoon studio; the Jimmy Durante Vulture in What's Buzzin' Buzzard (1943, Tex Avery), Butch, Meathead and Topsy in Baby Puss (1943, William Hanna and Joseph Barbera), the Wolf in The Screwy Truant (1945, Avery), the Piano Player in The Shooting of Dan McGoo (1945, Avery), Joe Wolf and the Bar Patrons in Wild and Woolfy (1945, Avery), the Cat in The Cat That Hated People (1948, Avery) and Bad Luck Blackie (1949, Avery), the Hunter in Doggone Tired (1949, Avery), the Lawyer and Dogcatcher in Wags to Riches (1949, Avery), and the Pound Worker and Joe Bear in Rock-a-Bye Bear (1952, Avery).

Personal life
He was married to Bernice McGeehan. They had two children, including actress Mary Kate McGeehan.

Death
McGeehan died at St. Joseph’s Medical Center in Burbank after suffering a cerebral hemorrhage on January 3, 1988. He was 80.

Filmography

Film

Television

Radio

References

External links

1907 births
1988 deaths
American male radio actors
American male voice actors
American male television actors
Metro-Goldwyn-Mayer cartoon studio people
Male actors from Pennsylvania
Actors from Harrisburg, Pennsylvania